Gowd-e Giru (also Romanized as Gowd-e Gīrū) is a village in Gughar Rural District, in the Central District of Baft County, Kerman Province, Iran. At the 2006 census, its population was 60, with 21 families.

References 

Populated places in Baft County